Andrew John Ward (born 28 September 1952) is an English progressive rock drummer.

Early life
Born in Epsom, England, Ward attended the City of London Freemen's School. He began drumming at the age of 13 in a local rock band with Jim Butt (guitar), Doug Houston (vocals), Colin Burgess (bass) and Jan (Murray)  Obodynski (keyboards).

Career

Camel (1971–1981)
Ward became a founding member of the progressive rock band Camel, who formed in 1971, evolving from Ward's first band, The Brew. One of the leading lights of the English progressive rock movement, Camel enjoyed considerable success worldwide, peaking in 1975 when they performed their album The Snow Goose at the Royal Albert Hall, accompanied by the London Symphony Orchestra. Following a period of ill health – including problems caused by alcohol and drugs – in 1981 he was forced to retire from the band. With Ward's departure, Andrew Latimer became the only original member who remained in the band.

Marillion (1983)
Two years later he resurfaced briefly with the neo-progressive rock band Marillion, appearing in the video of the hit single "Garden Party" from their debut album Script for a Jester's Tear and performing with them for three months as a replacement for their original drummer, Mick Pointer, who had recently been sacked. Ward's performances with the band included an appearance on the BBC's The Old Grey Whistle Test when they performed "Forgotten Sons". According to Mark Kelly, Ward had been recruited to the band without a proper audition because of his reputation. However, as both Kelly and Fish have recalled, his personal problems had resurfaced and he succumbed to a nervous breakdown midway through the band's first American tour.

Canterbury (1987–2002)
Throughout the 1990s, Ward worked with Richard Sinclair's Caravan of Dreams and Going Going, with Sinclair, Hugh Hopper, Vince Clarke and Mark Hewins. In 1994, he joined Mirage – a progressive "supergroup" combining members from both Camel and Caravan. Other projects included the studio-only group the Chrysanthemums, led by singer-songwriter Yukio Yung (aka Terry Burrows), who received drum tracks through the post from Ward before building songs around them, playing all the other instruments himself. At this time Ward also became full-time drummer with the English rock band the Bevis Frond, with whom he recorded and toured extensively.

Present
In 2002 a compilation CD, Sticking Around, was released, highlighting his work with Camel and other projects.

In 2003, Ward participated in a short lived reformation of the original members of The Brew (with Latimer and Ferguson) and recorded material for an album that never materialized, largely due to Latimer's ongoing health issues.

Discography

Albums with Camel
Camel (1973)
Mirage (1974)
The Snow Goose (1975)
Moonmadness (1976)
Rain Dances (1977)
Breathless (1978)
I Can See Your House from Here (1979)
Nude (1981)

Studio albums
1971 Phil Goodhand Tait I Think I'll Write a Song
1985 Adrian Shaw Tea for the Hydra
1987 Stan Campbell Stan Campbell
1988 Skaboosh Freetown
1991 Todd Dillingham Wilde Canterbury Dream
1993 Todo Dillingham Vastrmpty Spaces
1994 Bevis Frond Sprawl
1995 Bevis Frond Superseeder
1995 Yukio Yung Goodbye Pork Pie Brain
1995 Yukio Yung Hello Pulsing Vein
1996 Yukio Yung Mostly Water
1996 Richard Sinclair Caravan of Dreams
1997 Richard Sinclair RSVP
1997 The Deviants Have Left the Planet
1998 Bevis Frond Valedictory Songs
1999 The Chrysanthemums The Baby's Head
1999 Steve Adams Vertigo
2002 Bevis Frond What Did for the Dinosaurs
2002 Anton Barbeau King of Missouri
2003 Hugh Hopper in a Dubious Manner
2003 Andy Ward Sticking Around

References

External links
 Personal website

1952 births
Living people
British male drummers
English rock drummers
Marillion members
Canterbury scene
Camel (band) members
People educated at City of London Freemen's School
Mirage (British band) members